Jens Andreas Ludvig Selmer  (July 14, 1845 – May 21, 1928) was a Norwegian stage actor and a film actor from the silent-film era.

Selmer made his debut in 1865 at the Christiania Theater, where he remained until 1899, except for two seasons at the New Christiania Norwegian Theatre (a.k.a. the Møllergaden Theater) under the direction of Bjørnstjerne Bjørnson. From 1899 to 1908 he was engaged with the National Theater. Selmer was a skilled and reliable character comedian. Among his roles were Jeppe in Jeppe on the Hill, Aslaksen in The League of Youth, and Old Ekdal in The Wild Duck.

Selmer was the son of Ludvig Selmer (1813–1898) and Maria Magdalene Selmer (1817–1903). His father was a manager at the Christiania Glass Shop. His brother Johan Selmer (1844–1910) became a well-known composer. With his wife Leonora Selmer (1850–1930), who was also an actress, he was the father of actor Ulf Selmer (1885–1961).

Filmography
1917: Unge hjerter as the priest

References

External links
 

1845 births
1928 deaths
Norwegian male stage actors
Norwegian male film actors
Norwegian male silent film actors
19th-century Norwegian male actors
20th-century Norwegian male actors
Male actors from Oslo
Burials at the Cemetery of Our Saviour